The Koyna River (Marathi pronunciation: [koːj(ə)naː]) is a tributary of the Krishna River which originates in Mahableshwar, Satara district, western Maharashtra, India. It rises near Mahabaleshwar, a famous hill station in the Western Ghats. Unlike most of the other rivers in Maharashtra which flow East-West direction, the Koyna river flows in North-South direction. The Koyna River is famous for the Koyna Dam and the Koyna Hydroelectric Project. Koyna Hydroelectric Project is the 2nd largest completed hydroelectric project in India. The reservoir – Shivasagar Lake, is a huge lake of 50 km in length.

Due to its electricity generating potential through Koyna Hydroelectric Project, Koyna river is known as the Life Line of Maharashtra

The river meets the Krishna River, which is one of the three largest rivers in southern India by Karad at Pritisangam

The river is just about 100 meters in width and is slow-flowing. It is an olive shade of green during the dry months and a bluish-brown in the monsoon months attributed to much algae and aquatic plant life. The impounded water of the Koyna Dam though has submerged a significant amount of Rain forest of the Western Ghats, it has helped a lot to the surrounding forest by supplying water all round the year. Hence a wide biodiversity of plants and animals is observed in the evergreen forest surrounding the river.

Geography and history 
Mahabaleshwar  is the source of five rivers namely Krishna River, Koyna, Venna (Veni), Savitri, and Gayatri. The source is at the Panchaganga temple in old Mahabaleshwar. The legendary source of the river is a spout from the mouth of a statue of a cow in the ancient temple of Mahadev in Old Mahabaleshwar. Legend has it that Krishna is Lord Vishnu himself as a result of a curse on the trimurtis by Savitri. Also, its tributaries Venna and Koyana are said to be Lord Shiva and Lord Brahma themselves. An interesting thing to notice is that 4other rivers including Koyna come out from the cow's mouth apart from Krishna and they all travel some distance before merging into Krishna. The biggest river Krishna River that flows across Maharashtra, Karnataka and Andhra Pradesh.

See also 

 List of rivers of India
 Rivers of India
 Koyna Hydroelectric Project
 Koyna Dam
 Koyna Wildlife Sanctuary
 List of power stations in India
 List of conventional hydroelectric power stations
 Other rivers originating at Mahabaleshwar (Panchganga) Gayatri River, Krishna River, Savitri River and Venna River

External links

References

Rivers of Maharashtra
Tributaries of the Krishna River
Rivers of India